Van Vlees en Bloed (English: "From Flesh and Blood") is an international award-winning Belgian tragicomedy and miniseries written by Tom Van Dyck and Michiel Devlieger. The series was produced by Woestijnvis and first aired in 2009 on the Belgian channel Eén.

The show is about a butcher shop owned by the family Vangenechten since 1952. Although the family name was indirectly inspired by, the characters are entirely fictitious and there is no direct link with the famous Belgian Vangenechten family.

Plot: Whereas André Vangenechten and his wife Liliane Verstappen run the shop, it is actually still owned by André's mother Maria Vangenechten. One day Rudy, the son of André and Liliane, suddenly turns up after an absence of 10 years. Liliane and Maria are happy, but André is not impressed.

The series won many prizes such as a Golden Nymph at the Monte-Carlo Television Festival and a Rockie at the Banff World Media Festival. In Belgium the series won at least 10 awards

Main cast and characters

Episodes

Audience measurement
The series was a success in Belgium. Episode 4, 5 and 6 break Belgian records for emissions broadcast on a weekday. (The series was broadcast on a Thursday) The average number of viewers was 1.753.500 per episode. Episode 6 reached close to 2 million viewers. The series end up on the third place in best viewed shows. Only one episode of Schalkse Ruiters (broadcast on Sunday)and the finale of De Slimste Mens ter Wereld 2009 did better. Remarkable detail: the finale of last show was sent out after episode 7.

Trivia
 The series was shot in Dessel, Mol and Retie
 The scenes in the woods were shot in Princes Park, Retie The number of visitors increased after the famous "wood fucking scene". Many tourists wanted to see the tree stump where the scene was shot but Woestijnvis never revealed the exact location.
 The family name Vangenechten (sometimes spelled Van Genechten) is generally considered to refer to the famous Flemish dynasty of entrepreneurs rooted in the East of Antwerp (Kempen) with branches all over the world. None of the offspring however actually own a butchery store.
 After the show aired, the interest in the butcher profession increased among young people. A statement by the butcher industry had to be issued, saying that show used outdated techniques, as the job of a butcher isn't what it used to be as it is presented in the series.

References

Flemish television shows
Belgian drama television shows
2000s Belgian television series
2009 Belgian television series debuts
2009 Belgian television series endings
Television shows set in Belgium
Television series about families
Fictional butchers
Eén original programming